Ramchandra Chandravansi University is a private university located in Palamu, Jharkhand, India. It was established in 2018.

References

External links
 

Universities and colleges in Jharkhand
Educational institutions established in 2018
2018 establishments in Jharkhand